Joy Destiny Tiurma Tobing (born 20 March 1980) is an Indonesian gospel singer and the winner of the first season of Indonesian Idol.

Biography
Tobing was a gospel singer when she signed up for the first season of Indonesian Idol, leading to some criticism since she was not considered an amateur.

She was expected to represent Indonesia in the Asian Idol and World Idol competitions, but disagreement arose with the idol show management, Indomugi Pratama, and her recording company, BMG Indonesia, insisting that as an artist she should not only have obligations but also have rights. During a press conference in November 2004, the team of Indomugi Pratama, BMG Indonesia, RCTI, and FremantleMedia, who hold the license of the Indonesian Idol program, claimed they were not sending Tobing to any Asian or World Idol because of this. They considered her disobedience as her failure to behave as a good idol.

In March 2005, Tobing terminated her contract with BMG Indonesia which, in September 2004, released her Idol album Terima Kasih. At her press conference, Tobing and her lawyer stated that the reason she had long been treated unfairly, BMG Indonesia had never informed her about the selling of the album and did not give her any royalties.

Contests
 1994: Cipta Pesona Bintang, RCTI
 1995: 1 Final Aksi, RCTI
 1997: Pioneer Asia 5th Laser Karaoke Competition
 2004: Indonesian Idol, RCTI
2013: "Fake ID"

Indonesian Idol performances
 Top 30: Nothing Compares 2 U by Sinéad O'Connor
 Top 11: Seindah Biasa by Siti Nurhaliza
 Top 9: Khayal by Purnama Sultan
 Top 8: To Love You More by Céline Dion
 Top 7: Pelangi by Chrisye
 Top 6: Kamu Harus Cepat Pulang by Slank
 Top 5: Pesta by Elfa's Singer
 Top 4: Mengertilah Kasih by Ruth Sahanaya
 Top 4: Kuakui by Dewi Sandra
 Top 3: Yang Terbaik by Ruth Sahanaya
 Top 3: Surat Cinta by Vina Panduwinata
 Grand Final: Karena Cinta by Glenn Fredly
 Grand Final: Kuakui by Dewi Sandra
 Grand Final: The Trouble With Love Is by Kelly Clarkson

Golden Memories Asia performances
 Top 24: Jangan Biarkan by Diana Nasution
 Top 20: Cinta Jangan Kau Pergi by Sheila Majid
 Top 16: Tanda-tanda by Mus Mujiono
 Top 12: Logika by Vina Panduwinata
 Top 9 Show Seandainya Aku Punya Sayap by Rita Butar-butar
 Top 9 Result: Mata Lelaki by Nicky Astria
 Top 6 Show: Ekspresi by Titi DJ
 Top 6 Result: Nuansa Bening by Keenan Nasution
 Top 4 Show: Cinta by Titiek Puspa
 Top 4 Result: TBA
 Grand Final Show: TBA
 Grand Final Result: TBA

Controversy
Before joining the Indonesian Idol competition, Tobing had released several records, mostly Christian songs and songs in her family's ethnic language, Batak. According to Tobing's father, BMG Indonesia had been informed about this during the parents' interview with BMG when she advanced to the finals. It became big news when Octopus Record published her old record, The Song Of Joy, around the same time as the release of Terima Kasih, her Idol album, and during her dispute with Indomugi Pratama and BMG Indonesia. The Song of Joy was recorded from 1998 to 1999, but had not been released until September 2004. According to Octopus Record, they had asked permission from BMG to release Tobing's old records. They also offered to buy the recording master from BMG so there would be no competition, but BMG refused.

The incidents between some finalists and the show management, Indomugi Pratama, had actually occurred previously. One of the Top 4, Helena Andrian, canceled her contract and had to withdraw from the competition shortly before the grand final, causing her to be hastily expelled in the middle of the night from the apartment provided for the finalists. According to Adrian, around 2–3 weeks before the grand final, the finalists were suddenly asked to sign a new contract with a new show management, Indomugi Pratama, with little time to consult or think about the contents, and little information was provided regarding their future management program. Among the clauses with which she disagreed were that all finalists were bound to Indomugi Pratama until three months after the grand final, when Indomugi Pratama would then decide who would stay with them for the following three years. Afterwards, Indomugi Pratama would still continue to receive royalties for a total of 15 years.

Discography
 Didia ("Where")
 Pada Kaki Salib-Mu ("At The Foot of Your Cross") with her sister, Jelita Tobing
 Praise & Worship (compilation)
 Wave Of Worship (compilation)
 Katakan Salahku
 Joy
 The Song Of Joy
 Indonesian Idol: Indonesian All-Time Hits (compilation)
 Terima Kasih ("Thank You", 2004)
 Rise (2005)
 Mujizat Itu Nyata ("The Miracle is True", 2006)
 Faithful (2008)

References

External links
Official site of Joy Tobing

1980 births
English-language singers from Indonesia
Indonesian Christians
21st-century Indonesian women singers
Indonesian gospel singers
Indonesian Idol winners
Indonesian performers of Christian music
Indonesian pop singers
Living people
People of Batak descent
Singers from Jakarta